Gong Guohua (born January 22, 1964) is a retired male decathlete from PR China. A one-time Olympian (1988) he set his personal best in the men's decathlon (7908 points) in Beijing on June 24, 1990.

Achievements

References

1964 births
Living people
Chinese decathletes
Athletes (track and field) at the 1988 Summer Olympics
Olympic athletes of China
Asian Games medalists in athletics (track and field)
Athletes (track and field) at the 1990 Asian Games
Asian Games bronze medalists for China
Medalists at the 1990 Asian Games